Stabilization is a process to help prevent a sick or injured person from having their medical condition deteriorate further too quickly before they can be treated in depth at a medical facility. 

Stabilization is often performed by the first person to arrive on scene, EMTs, or nurses before or just after arrival in hospital.  It includes controlling bleeding, arranging for proper evacuation, keeping patients warm with blankets, and calming them by providing personal attention and concern for their well-being.

It is particularly important in trauma cases where spinal injury is suspected to immobilize the cervical spine, or back.  Failure to do so can cause permanent paralysis or death. In the field, spinal stabilization involves moving the person's back as a single unit with as many as five rescuers assisting, then applying a cervical collar (which can be improvised from duct tape and cardboard), and securing victims to a solid-backed stretcher, long spine board, or a vacuum mattress. 

Search and rescue technicians trained in wilderness first aid have a protocol for verifying that the spine has not been hurt (clearing the cervical spine) when the victim is several hours or more from the hospital and evacuation may not be indicated.  Without this technique, it may be necessary to carry a suspected trauma victim out only to discover that he had no injury worthy of the effort and expense.

Intensive care medicine
Emergency medical services